Luis Alberto Benítez (born February 14, 1985, in Ezpeleta) is an Argentine football midfielder who last played for Quilmes Atlético Club of the Primera División in Argentina.

Teams
 Racing Club 2003–2006
 Santiago Wanderers 2007
 Racing Club 2008
 Olmedo 2009
 Racing Club 2010–2011
 Quilmes 2011–2012

References
 

1985 births
Living people
Argentine footballers
Argentine expatriate footballers
Argentine Primera División players
Racing Club de Avellaneda footballers
C.D. Olmedo footballers
Quilmes Atlético Club footballers
Santiago Wanderers footballers
Expatriate footballers in Chile
Expatriate footballers in Ecuador
Association football midfielders